The AWP Award is an annual competition for the publication of new book-length works.

The Association of Writers & Writing Programs (AWP) is a nonprofit organization of writers, teachers, colleges, and universities. 
The Donald Hall Prize for Poetry is an award of $5,000 and publication. 
The Grace Paley Prize for Short Fiction is an award of $5,000 and publication. Winners in the novel and creative nonfiction categories receive a $2,000 cash honorarium and publication. 
AWP hires a staff of “screeners” who review manuscripts for the judges, who select ten manuscripts in each genre for each judge’s final evaluations.

References

American poetry awards
Short story awards
Awards established in 1975